The Treaty of Windsor (1175) was a territorial agreement made during the time of the Norman invasion of Ireland. It was signed in Windsor, Berkshire by King Henry II of England and the Ard Rí or High King of Ireland, Ruaidrí Ua Conchobair (Rory O'Connor).

Treaty 
Overall, the agreement left O'Connor with a kingdom consisting of Ireland outside the provincial kingdom of Leinster (as it was then), Dublin and a territory from Waterford Dungarvan, as long as he paid tribute to Henry II, and owed fealty to him. All of Ireland was also subject to the new religious provisions of the papal bull Laudabiliter and the Synod of Cashel (1172).

O'Connor was obliged to pay one treated cow hide for every ten cattle. The other "kings and people" of Ireland were to enjoy their lands and liberties so long as they remained faithful to the kings of England, and were obliged to pay their tribute in hides through O'Connor.

The witnesses were Richard of Ilchester, Bishop of Winchester; Geoffrey, Bishop of Ely; Laurence O'Toole, Archbishop of Dublin; William, Earl of Essex; Justiciar Richard de Luci; Geoffrey de Purtico, Reginald de Courtenea (Courtenay) and three of Henry's court chaplains.

The Annals of Tigernach recorded that: "Cadla Ua Dubthaig came from England from the Son of the Empress, having with him the peace of Ireland, and the kingship thereof, both Foreigner and Gael, to Ruaidhrí Ó Conchobhair, and to every provincial king his province from the king of Ireland, and their tributes to Ruaidhrí." The Annals also listed the ongoing violence in Ireland at the time. The text reveals a misunderstanding of the scope of the treaty and the matters agreed by the two kings that soon proved fatal to the peace of Ireland. Henry saw O'Connor as his subordinate within the feudal system, paying him an annual rent on behalf of all his sub-kings; O'Connor saw himself as the restored High King of Ireland, subject only to a very affordable annual tribute to Henry.

Treaty Text

Outcomes 
The treaty broke down very quickly, as O'Connor was unable to prevent Norman knights carving out new territories on a freelance basis, starting with assaults on Munster and Ulaid in 1177. For his part Henry was by now too distant to suppress them and was preoccupied with events in France. In 1177 he replaced William FitzAldelm with his 10-year-old son Prince John and named him as Lord of Ireland.

See also 
List of treaties

References

External links 

1175
History of Berkshire
Windsor, Berkshire
1175 in Ireland
1175 in England
12th-century treaties
Peace treaties of Ireland
Windsor 1175
Treaties of medieval England